Saint-Benoist-sur-Mer (literally Saint Benoist on sea) is a commune in the Vendée department in the Pays de la Loire region in western France.

Geography
The river Lay forms most of the commune's south-eastern border.

See also
Communes of the Vendée department

References

Communes of Vendée